In mathematical logic, a superintuitionistic logic is a propositional logic extending intuitionistic logic.  Classical logic is the strongest consistent superintuitionistic logic; thus, consistent superintuitionistic logics are called intermediate logics (the logics are intermediate between intuitionistic logic and classical logic).

Definition
A superintuitionistic logic is a set L of propositional formulas in a countable set of
variables pi satisfying the following properties:
1. all axioms of intuitionistic logic belong to L;
2. if F and G are formulas such that F and F → G both belong to L, then G also belongs to L (closure under modus ponens);
3. if F(p1, p2, ..., pn) is a formula of L, and G1, G2, ..., Gn are any formulas, then F(G1, G2, ..., Gn) belongs to L (closure under substitution).
Such a logic is intermediate if furthermore
4. L is not the set of all formulas.

Properties and examples
There exists a continuum of different intermediate logics. Specific intermediate logics are often constructed by adding one or more axioms to intuitionistic logic, or by a semantical description. Examples of intermediate logics include:
 intuitionistic logic (IPC, Int, IL, H)
 classical logic (CPC, Cl, CL):  =  = 
 the logic of the weak excluded middle (KC, Jankov's logic, De Morgan logic): 
 Gödel–Dummett logic (LC, G): 
 Kreisel–Putnam logic (KP): 
 Medvedev's logic of finite problems (LM, ML): defined semantically as the logic of all frames of the form  for finite sets X ("Boolean hypercubes without top"),  not known to be recursively axiomatizable
 realizability logics
 Scott's logic (SL): 
 Smetanich's logic (SmL): 
 logics of bounded cardinality (BCn): 
 logics of bounded width, also known as the logic of bounded anti-chains (BWn, BAn): 
 logics of bounded depth (BDn): 
 logics of bounded top width (BTWn): 
 logics of bounded branching (Tn, BBn): 
 Gödel n-valued logics (Gn): LC + BCn−1 = LC + BDn−1

Superintuitionistic or intermediate logics form a complete lattice with intuitionistic logic as the bottom and the inconsistent logic (in the case of superintuitionistic logics) or classical logic (in the case of intermediate logics) as the top. Classical logic is the only coatom in the lattice of superintuitionistic logics; the lattice of intermediate logics also has a unique coatom, namely SmL.

The tools for studying intermediate logics are similar to those used for intuitionistic logic, such as Kripke semantics. For example, Gödel–Dummett logic has a simple semantic characterization in terms of total orders.

Semantics

Given a Heyting algebra H, the set of propositional formulas that are valid in H is an intermediate logic. Conversely, given an intermediate logic it is possible to construct its Lindenbaum–Tarski algebra, which is then a Heyting algebra.

An intuitionistic Kripke frame F is a partially ordered set, and a Kripke model M is a Kripke frame with valuation such that  is an upper subset of F. The set of propositional formulas that are valid in F is an intermediate logic. Given an intermediate logic L it is possible to construct a Kripke model M such that the logic of M is L (this construction is called the canonical model). A Kripke frame with this property may not exist, but a general frame always does.

Relation to modal logics

Let A be a propositional formula. The Gödel–Tarski translation of A is defined recursively as follows:

If M is a modal logic extending S4 then ρM = {A | T(A) ∈ M} is a superintuitionistic logic, and M is called a modal companion of ρM. In particular:

IPC = ρS4
KC = ρS4.2
LC = ρS4.3
CPC = ρS5

For every intermediate logic L there are many modal logics M such that L = ρM.

See also 
 List of logic systems

References

Toshio Umezawa. On logics intermediate between intuitionistic and classical predicate logic. Journal of Symbolic Logic, 24(2):141–153, June 1959.
Alexander Chagrov, Michael Zakharyaschev. Modal Logic. Oxford University Press, 1997.

Systems of formal logic
Propositional calculus
Non-classical logic